Hanson Victor Turner VC (17 July 1910 – 7 June 1944) was an English recipient of the Victoria Cross, the highest and most prestigious award for gallantry in the face of the enemy that can be awarded to British and Commonwealth forces.

Details
Turner was 33 years old, and an acting sergeant in the 1st Battalion, The West Yorkshire Regiment (The Prince of Wales's Own), British Army during the Second World War. He was awarded the VC for his actions on 6/7 June 1944 during Operation U-Go at Ningthoukong, India, when he almost "single-handedly" and with "doggedness and spirit of endurance of the highest order" held off Japanese attacks until the morning by running back to replenish his supplies. He was killed while throwing a grenade.

Citation

The citation refers to Ningthoukong as being in Burma, but it is actually in the state of Manipur in India.

Legacy
Although Hanson Victor Turner was 'originally' a 'Duke', he was serving with The West Yorkshire Regiment (The Prince of Wales's Own) when he was awarded his VC.  When his medal was put up for sale, at auction, it was purchased by the Halifax Town Council, as he was a local, Halifax, resident.  It is displayed in The Duke of Wellington's Regiment Regimental Museum in Bankfield Museum, Halifax, West Yorkshire, England.

References

British VCs of World War 2 (John Laffin, 1997)
Monuments to Courage (David Harvey, 1999)
The Register of the Victoria Cross (This England, 1997)

External links
 

1910 births
1944 deaths
British Army personnel killed in World War II
West Yorkshire Regiment soldiers
Duke of Wellington's Regiment soldiers
People from Andover, Hampshire
British World War II recipients of the Victoria Cross
British Army recipients of the Victoria Cross
Military personnel from Hampshire